The 29th National Hockey League All-Star Game was held at the Spectrum in Philadelphia, home of the Philadelphia Flyers, on January 20,
1976. Wales Conference All-Star team defeated the Campbell Conference 7–5 after opening up a 6–1 lead in the second period. 
Peter Mahovlich was voted most valuable player of the game after scoring
a goal and three assists.

Team Lineups

Game summary 

Goaltenders : 
 Wales  : Dryden (29:34 minutes), Thomas (30:26 minutes).
 Campbell : Resch (29:18), Stephenson (29:42 minutes).

Shots on goal : 
Wales (42) 13 - 17 - 12 
Campbell (24) 09 - 06 - 09 

Referee : Lloyd Gilmour

Linesmen : Neil Armstrong, John D'Amico

Notes
Borje Salming made history by becoming the first European born and -bred player to participate in an NHL All-Star game (Stan Mikita, Ken Hodge and Walt Tkaczuk were also born in Europe but did not start to play hockey before moving to Canada at an early age). From 1976 onwards, every NHL All-Star game to date has featured at least one European player.

Reigning Hart Trophy winner Bobby Clarke was selected but did not play. He was replaced by his Philadelphia Flyers' teammate Rick MacLeish.

In addition to the NHL All-Star Game, the Major League Baseball All-Star Game, the NBA All Star Game, and the Men's Final Four were all held in Philadelphia in honor of the location of the signing of the Declaration of Independence, as 1976 was the United States Bicentennial.

See also
1975–76 NHL season

References

NHL
National Hockey League All-Star Game
Ice hockey competitions in Philadelphia
National Hockey League All-Star Game
National Hockey League All-Star Games
1970s in Philadelphia